Livio Maritano (28 August 1925 – 6 May 2014) was an Italian Catholic bishop.

Ordained to the priesthood in 1948, Maritano was named auxiliary bishop of the Archdiocese of Torino, Italy and titular bishop of Opitergium on 19 October 1968. In 1979, he was named bishop of the Roman Catholic Diocese of Acqui and retired in 2000.

Bishop Maritano was the promoter of the cause of beatification of Blessed Chiara Badano, beatified in Rome, in the Santuario della Madonna del Divino Amore, 25 September 2010. He knew Blessed Chiara personally.

Notes

1925 births
2014 deaths
Bishops of Acqui
People from Giaveno